Mack & Moxy is a computer-animated children's television series. Each episode teaches children lifelong lessons of charity and compassion, while celebrating the joy of helping others. Created by Brahm Wenger and Alan Green, the show combines 3D animation, live-action costumes, and original songs and music. The show is distributed by American Public Television and aired on PBS Kids from February 5, 2016 to February 16, 2020, but reruns continue to air on some PBS stations. The complete first season began streaming on Netflix in October 2016.

Overview  
Each episode includes two 14-minute segments and follows Mack, a lovable, mooselike lummox, and Moxy, a feisty, raccoon/fox-inspired go-getter as they take off on another adventure. Together with a helpful Trooper (child), they set out to rescue another Great Helpee in a far-off mystical place called HelpeeLand.

Along the way, Mack & Moxy meet a new Friend-In-Need who introduces Mack & Moxy (and the kids at home) to a new important cause.

A number of non-profits and government organizations have partnered with Mack & Moxy for the show's first season. These include: American Heart Association, American Red Cross, Citizen Schools, Easter Seals, Feeding America, National Highway Traffic Safety Administration, National Park Foundation, Orange County Sheriff's Department, Playworks, President's Council on Fitness, Sports & Nutrition, Save the Children and World Wildlife Fund.

Production 
Mack & Moxy was created by executive producer Brahm Wenger, who has worked for Walt Disney Pictures for over 17 years, producing and writing the scores and songs for over 40 children's films – including the complete Air Bud and Air Buddies series. The show is co-produced by Bardel Entertainment.

Characters 
 Mack – A mooselike gentle giant – the enthusiastic, fun-loving instant best pal of everyone he meets. He's always ready to lead, follow or dance, depending on the situation. Voiced by Brian Drummond. 
 Moxy – A power-packed gorgeous pink raccoon who's filled with endless energy and eternal optimism.  Voiced by Kathleen Barr.
 The Troopers – Each episode features a guest Trooper, children are selected with, and for, the non-profit and their cause. The Troopers helped Mack & Moxy on their adventure to rescue the Great Helpee, while sharing knowledge about the cause.
 Friend-In-Need – In each episode, Mack & Moxy meet a Friend-in-Need on one of their many adventures to save another Great Helpee. The Friend-in-Need introduces Mack & Moxy (and the audience at home) to a new and important cause.
 The Admirable – The leader of the Great Helpee Heroes who sends Mack & Moxy on their mission to save another Great Helpee. Sometimes played by a guest celebrity. Season 1 guest stars include: Kal Penn, Keegan-Michael Key, Dean Norris, Eva LaRue, Matt Lucas, Melissa Fumero, Josh Duhamel, and Rachael Ray. Female admirables (like Kellee McQuinn) wear golden bowtie necklaces around their necks and ornament headbands on their heads while male admirables wear golden neckties around their necks and goggles on their foreheads.  
 Clixx – A classic, scatter-brained brainiac robot. Clixx's job is to provide technical help and guidance via Instant Moosaging to Mack & Moxy on their adventure to save the Great Helpee. Voiced by James Murray.
 The Great Helpee – Magical creatures whose powers bring happiness and helpfulness to the world. In each episode, a new Great Helpee is about to hatch in HelpeeLand and the show's Heroes are on a mission to find it first. 
 Shelfish Sheldon – A devil lobster with big problems. He's a selfish, claw-rubbing schemer who is obsessed with keeping all the Great Helpees for himself. Voiced by Hank Azaria.

Episodes

Awards 
 2016: Won the Parents' Choice Award for Spring 2016 Television

References

External links  
 
 Official website

2010s preschool education television series
2010s American animated television series
2016 American television series debuts
2016 American television series endings
2010s Canadian animated television series
2016 Canadian television series debuts
2016 Canadian television series endings
American children's animated adventure television series
American children's animated fantasy television series
American children's animated musical television series
American computer-animated television series
American preschool education television series
American television shows featuring puppetry
American television series with live action and animation
Animated television series about mammals
Animated preschool education television series
Canadian children's animated adventure television series
Canadian children's animated fantasy television series
Canadian children's animated musical television series
Canadian computer-animated television series
Canadian preschool education television series
Canadian television shows featuring puppetry
Canadian television series with live action and animation
English-language television shows
Fictional duos
PBS Kids shows
PBS original programming